DuWayne H. Bridges (born June 10, 1946) is a Republican former member of the Alabama House of Representatives, where he represented the 38th District from 2000 to 2014.

Bridges was born in Shawnee, Oklahoma and resides in Valley, Alabama. He graduated from Faulkner University in 1990 with a bachelor's degree in business administration and from Troy State University (now Troy University) in 1992 with a master's degree in human resource management. Bridge and his wife Pat have two children (DuWayne Jr. and Karen) and eight grandchildren. He is a member of the Assembly of God church.

References

1946 births
Living people
Republican Party members of the Alabama House of Representatives
Faulkner University alumni
Troy University alumni